Paul Russo (April 10, 1914 in Kenosha, Wisconsin – February 13, 1976 in Clearwater, Florida) was an American racecar driver.

Midget car career
He started racing midget cars in 1934. He went with a contingent of midget-car drivers to Hawaii in the winter of 1934–35. He was the 1938 AAA Eastern Midget Champion. Russo won the first race held at the Nutley Velodrome in New Jersey in 1938.

Russo was part of midget racing's "Chicago Gang" with Emil Andres, Tony Bettenhausen, Duke Nalon, Cowboy O'Rourke, Jimmy Snyder, and Wally Zale.

Championship car career
Russo drove in the AAA and USAC Championship Car series, racing in the 1940–1941, 1946–1954, 1956–1959 and 1962 seasons with 85 starts, including the Indianapolis 500 races in each year but 1951 and 1952.  He finished in the top ten 49 times, with 3 victories: at Springfield (1950), Detroit (1951) and Williams Grove (1952).  Russo's best finish in the Indy 500 was fourth in 1957 when he was at the wheel of a Novi Special.  In 1955, Russo co-drove with Tony Bettenhausen to a second-place finish.

Russo's brother Joe and nephew Eddie also raced in the Indianapolis 500.

On February 13, 1976, Russo died off the coast of Clearwater while in Florida for the Daytona 500. Russo is buried at Crown Hill Cemetery in Indianapolis, Indiana.

Career award
Russo was inducted in the National Midget Auto Racing Hall of Fame in 1992.

Complete AAA/USAC Championship Car results

* shared drive with Tony Bettenhausen

Indianapolis 500 results

* shared drive with Tony Bettenhausen

World Championship career summary
The Indianapolis 500 was part of the FIA World Championship from 1950 through 1960. Drivers competing at Indy during those years were credited with World Championship points and participation. Paul Russo participated in 8 World Championship races. He set 1 fastest lead lap, finished on the podium once and accumulated a total of 8.5 World Championship points.

References

Paul Russo Dies, Ex-Racing Driver, February 18, 1976, The New York Times.

External links

1914 births
1976 deaths
Burials at Crown Hill Cemetery
Indianapolis 500 drivers
Sportspeople from Kenosha, Wisconsin
Racing drivers from Wisconsin
American people of Italian descent